Green Power is a non-governmental organisation in Hong Kong founded in 1988, concerned with the city's environmental issues.

Activities and works

Environmental education 
Green Power established the first Green Schools Network in Hong Kong to encourage environmental education in co-operation with schools. It works closely with teachers to promote and foster green awareness in young children. Three Environmental Resource Centres have been established in secondary and primary schools.

Environmental Resources Centres 
The Tsuen Wan Environmental Resources Centre and Wan Chai Environmental Resources Centre were established by Environmental Protection Department, and they have been managed by Green Power since 2000 and 2006, respectively. The centres provide the public with environmental information and reading materials and with guided visit services. They serve as bases for spreading environmental protection messages through the community.

Green Power Hike 
The Green Power Hike is an annual charitable walkathon for Green Power. It is the largest annual race held on the 50-km Hong Kong Trail. First held in 1994 with only a hundred participants, more than 28,000 people have now participated in the hike, raising more than HK$26 million. In 2008 alone, it attracted approximately 3,000 participants and raised more than HK$4,000,000 in donations. All donations are used to fund local green education in kindergartens, primary, and secondary schools.

References

External links 
 Green Power English Homepage

Environmental organisations based in Hong Kong
1988 establishments in Hong Kong
Environmental organizations established in 1988

zh:綠色力量